Andrew Jackson (October 29, 1844July 5, 1899) was a Michigan politician and soldier.

Early life
Jackson was born in Henry County, Ohio on October 29, 1844. Jackson graduated from Toledo High School.

Military career
Jackson enlisted in the Union Army in 1861 as part of the 68th Ohio Infantry. From 1861 to 1862, Jackson would rise through the ranks. He would become second lieutenant in October 1861, then first lieutenant and regimental adjutant in August 1862. Jackson resigned from the army in August 1863 due to wounds he received. Jackson would re-enlist on in 1864 as a private in the 147th Ohio Infantry. By the end of the war, Jackson was a brevet major.

Professional career
Sometime between 1872 and 1873, Jackson moved from Louisville, Kentucky to Sault Sainte Marie, Michigan. There, he worked as a contractor for the Soo Locks. On November 5, 1878, Jackson was elected to the Michigan House of Representatives where he represented the Cheboygan County district from January 1, 1879 to 1880.

Personal life
Jackson married Barbara Shoupe in Tennessee. Jackson was widowed upon her death in Piqua, Ohio in 1871. Jackson remarried on November 9, 1877 to Helen J. Myers in Sault Sainte Marie, Michigan. Together, they had a daughter on January 6, 1892.

Death
Jackson died in Sault Sainte Marie, Michigan on July 5, 1899. Jackson was interred at Riverside Cemetery in Sault Sainte Marie on July 8, 1899.

References

1844 births
1899 deaths
Democratic Party members of the Michigan House of Representatives
People from Sault Ste. Marie, Michigan
People from Henry County, Ohio
Burials in Michigan
Union Army soldiers
People of Ohio in the American Civil War
19th-century American politicians